"Love's Lines, Angles and Rhymes" is a song written by Dorothea Joyce and performed by The 5th Dimension.  It reached #6 on the U.S. adult contemporary chart, #19 in Canada, #19 on the Billboard Hot 100, and #28 on the U.S. R&B chart in 1971.  It was featured on their 1971 album, Love's Lines, Angles and Rhymes.

The song was produced by Bones Howe and arranged by Bob Alcivar.

Other versions
Diana Ross recorded a version of the song in 1970 that was eventually released as a bonus track on the 2002 Expanded Edition of Diana Ross
Brotherhood of Man released a version of the song on their 1972 album, We're the Brotherhood of Man

References

1970 songs
1971 singles
The 5th Dimension songs
Song recordings produced by Bones Howe
Bell Records singles